A light horse field ambulance was an Australian World War I military unit whose purpose was to provide medical transport and aid to the wounded and sick soldiers of an Australian Light Horse brigade.

Typically a Lieutenant Colonel commanded each ambulance. All officers of the ambulance were medical doctors or surgeons. Dental units were often attached to the ambulance as well.

An ambulance consisted of two sections, the Mobile and the Immobile. The Mobile Section travel with its brigade into combat, where it would establish a Dressing Station. It use stretchers or carts to retrieve the wounded and transport them to the Dressing Station. The Immobile Section established and operated a Receiving Station, which received the wounded the Dressing Station sent on. The ambulance's surgeons would operate on the wounded at the Receiving Station. From the Receiving Station, the sick and wounded would go first to the Casualty Clearing Station and ultimately to a Base Hospital.

Transport 
The light horse field ambulances operated in the Middle East theatre: Egypt, the Sinai peninsula, Palestine and Syria.  The methods used to transport the wounded had to operate effectively in the sandy, dusty environment.

 Stretcher  As in infantry field ambulances, stretchers were used for transport over short distances, rough terrain or when enemy fire prevented the safe employment of bearer animals.

 Cycle stretcher  These were unpopular and ineffective; after the Gaza battles the forces abandoned the use of cycle stretchers.

 Sand cart  The mainstay of the transport section was the sand cart. It featured wide steel rims and was designed be able to carry three stretchers over soft sand. Six horses or mules provided the motive power. The sand cart was poorly suited to operating on the hard, rough ground of Palestine and Syria, and breakdowns were frequent.

 Sand sledge  Used to transport one stretcher case over sand; two horses pulled the sledge.

 Light ambulance wagon  Drawn by a four horse team, the light ambulance wagon was designed by Surgeon Colonel W.D.C. Williams. Wagons of this type were taken to Egypt by some of the field ambulance units during the early days of World War I.

 Camel cacolet  The camel cacolet was used to carry wounded over long distances on rough terrain impassable to wheeled transport. There were two types of cacolet: the sitting and the lying down type. One camel would carry two patients, one on either side of the camel's hump.

See also
Military unit
Field hospital
Australian Army Medical Units, World War I

Ambulances
Army medical units and formations of Australia
Cavalry units and formations of Australia
Military units and formations of Australia in World War I
Military ambulances